Tracy Reed is an American actress and former model.

Reed was born in Fort Benning, Georgia. She is the daughter of David Reed, a retired Army major, and Anne Reed, a teacher. She majored in English at UCLA and planned to write children's books for a profession. While she was a student, a tryout led to her becoming a blackout gag player in the TV series Love, American Style (1969–70, 1972–74). 

Reed co-starred in the 1970 TV series Barefoot in the Park and played Virginia Tyndall in the 1979 TV miniseries Women in White. Her most memorable film roles include No Way Back (1976), Car Wash (1976), A Piece of the Action (1977), ...All the Marbles (1981) and Running Scared (1986).

In 1971, the California Press Photographers Association named Reed the Most Beautiful Face in Television.

Filmography
Trouble Man (1972) - Policewoman
The Great American Beauty Contest (1973 - TV Movie) - Pamela Parker, Miss New Jersey
The Take (1974) - Nancy
Train Ride to Hollywood (1975) - Stupid bimbo
No Way Back (1976) - Candy
Car Wash (1976) - Mona
A Piece of the Action (1977) - Nikki McLean
Top Secret (1978) - Magee
Terror Among Us (1981 - TV Movie) - Barbara 
...All the Marbles (1981) - Diane, Toledo Tiger
Running Scared (1986) - Maryann

References

External links

Living people
Actresses from Georgia (U.S. state)
20th-century American actresses
American television actresses
African-American actresses
American film actresses
20th-century African-American women
20th-century African-American people
21st-century African-American people
21st-century African-American women
Year of birth missing (living people)